4 Artillery Regiment is based at Potchefstroom, responsible for the training of soldiers allotted to Field and Medium Artillery.

History

Origins

Under the UDF
On May 28, 1945, authority was granted for the formation of 4 Field Artillery as a full-time regiment with effect 1 April 1945.

Successor to 4 Field Brigade
4 Artillery was the successor to 4 Field Brigade, which had made a name for itself at Combolcia, Dessie and Amba Alagi in Ethiopia. The regiment served at El Alamein under its own name – as part of 1 SA Division – and in Italy as part of 6 SA Armoured Division, notably at Monte Stanco.

In May 1946 the unit became part of the Permanent Force's 11 Armoured Brigade. When the latter was disbanded in 1951, the unit continued on as 10 Field Battery.

4 Field Training Regiment
Based in Potchefstroom, it became 4 Field Training Regiment in 1953 with 10, 11 and 12 Field Batteries at Potchefstroom, Bloemfontein and Oudtshoorn respectively. It was disestablished as a training institution in November 1967. It continued as 4th Field Regiment from 1967 to 1975 with 1 Medium, 41 and 42 batteries based at Potchefstroom and 43 battery in Walvis Bay. 1 Medium battery used the BL5.5-inch medium howitzer (eighty pounder) whereas 41, 42 and 43 batteries used the Ordnance QF 25-pounder.

Under the SADF

Border War
The Regiment reactivated in 1975 and took part in most operations since Operation Savannah in 1976. It was back in action in August and September 1981 in support of Operation Protea with 41 Bty (120mm mortar) and 43 Bty (120mm mortar) and Operation Daisy with 43 Bty (120mm mortar) in support of 61 Mechanised Battalion Group. In 1983 the Regiment became part of 10 Artillery Brigade (with 14 Artillery Regiment) and was renamed 4 Artillery Regiment the next year.
By 1987 4 Artillery was structured as:
 41 Battery
 42 Battery
 43 Battery and
 1 Medium Battery

In 1987 the Regiment took part in Operation Moduler and in 1988 in Operation Hooper, Operation Displace and Operation Prone. In 1989, the Regiment was part of the Merlyn Brigade based at Grootfontein, returning home after Namibian independence. The Artillery Brigade and 14 Artillery Regiment disbanded on January 1, 1993.

Internal operations
In 1985 and 1986 the unit had tours as provisional infantry in Soweto, Tembisa, Alexandra and in the KwaNdebele homeland.

Under the SANDF

Organisation

The regiment is currently organised as a composite unit and has a growth capability for the establishment of additional regiments if required:
 4 Regimental Support Battery (4 RSB)
 41 (Papa) Battery Soltam M-65 120mm mortar
 42 (Quebec) Battery G6 155mm Gun/Howitzer
 43 (Romeo) Battery Bateleur FV2 127mm multiple rocket launcher
 44 (Sierra) Battery G5 155mm Gun/Howitzer
 45 Battery Target Acquisition Bty

Regimental Colours
In March 1973 the unit broke with artillery tradition, which recognises the unit's guns as its colours, and took possession of a regimental colour, becoming the first artillery regiment to be presented with a regimental colour and claims to be the first to have appointed an honorary colonel.

Insignia

Previous Dress Insignia

Leadership 

 Col (Hon) Johann Oosthuizen 1984 2012
 Lt Col Nick Bierman CBE 19461947
 Lt Col Bob Meintjies DSO 1950 1953
 Cmdt Sarel Buijs 1991
 Col Deon Holtzhausen 19941997
 Lt Col Sarel Kruger
 Lt Col Thulani Zungu
 Lt Col André J. Claassen 2004-2006
 Lt Col Victor Khasapane 20062010
 Lt Col Jongile Maso 20142016
 Lt Col Mimy Matimbe 20172020

Freedom of the City

The regiment was awarded the Freedom of Potchefstroom in 1984.

References 

Artillery regiments of South Africa
Military units and formations in Potchefstroom
Military units and formations established in 1945
Military units and formations of the British Empire
Military units and formations of South Africa in the Border War